WGO may refer to:
 KWGO, known as WGO, radio station in Burlington, North Dakota, US
 World Gastroenterology Organisation
 Winnebago Industries, NYSE symbol
 Winchester Regional Airport, Virginia, US, IATA code